Albert Madansky (1934-2022) was a statistician known for his work in stock option pricing and the prediction of an accidental nuclear detonation. Alongside Gary L. Gastineau, he developed the Gastineau-Madansky model for stock option pricing and later co-authored the Edmundson-Madansky theorem (which falls in the field of stochastic linear programming).  Some of his early research at RAND Corporation was used to develop Permissive Action Links, which help mitigate a nuclear accident.  Apart from this serious work, he organized an effort with other scholars to determine the best pastrami sandwich among the Kosher delis of New York City.

References

1934 births
2022 deaths
People from Chicago
University of Chicago alumni